Apache Excalibur project produces a set of libraries for component based programming in the Java language. Its main products include the inversion of control (IoC) framework Avalon, an Avalon-based container named Fortress, and a set of Avalon compatible software components.

Excalibur spun out of the original Apache Avalon project following Avalon's closure in 2004. Since that time Apache Excalibur has hosted the Avalon framework and related source code.

Excalibur project has been retired by Apache Software foundation and it has been moved to Apache Attic

See also
 Apache Software Foundation
 Apache Cocoon

External links
 
 History of Apache Avalon and Excalibur

Excalibur
Free software programmed in Java (programming language)